This is a list of aromantic characters in fiction, i.e. fictional characters that either self-identify as aromantic or have been identified by outside parties to be aromantic. Listed characters may also be asexual or allosexual (not asexual). Some aromantic people are asexual but some are not. The term aromantic can be used in relation to various sexual identities, such as aromantic bisexual, aromantic heterosexual, aromantic lesbian, aromantic gay man, or aromantic asexual, but it does not relate to sexual orientation, instead focusing on romantic orientation. Aromanticism primarily deals with romantic attraction rather than with sexuality. Some publications have argued that there is an underrepresentation of aromantic people in media, in research, and that they are often misunderstood. Aromantic people often face stigma and are stereotyped with labels such as being afraid of intimacy, heartless, or deluded.

Animated series

Literature

Live-action television

Webcomics, comics, and graphic novels

See also 

 Timeline of asexual history
 List of fictional polyamorous characters
 List of animated series with LGBTQ characters
 List of comedy television series with LGBT characters
 List of dramatic television series with LGBT characters: 1970s–2000s
 List of dramatic television series with LGBT characters: 2010s

Notes

References

Further reading 
 What It Means To Be 'Aromantic,' According To Aromantic People, HuffPost, October 6, 2018
 Aromantic meaning explained by aro folks, Cosmopolitan, February 24, 2021
 Aromantic-spectrum Union for Recognition, Education, and Advocacy
 7 Facts You Should Know About Aromantic People, them., February 23, 2018
 Aromantic Spectrum Awareness Week

asexual
 
Non-sexuality
Sexual attraction
Romance
Sexual orientation